Cincinnati magazine is a monthly lifestyle magazine concerning life in and about Cincinnati, Ohio. It was created by the Greater Cincinnati Chamber of Commerce in 1967. It was then purchased by CM Media in 1981. By 1997, the magazine had a circulation of some 30,000 and was acquired by Emmis Communications. During the early-mid-2000s, the magazine prospered, doubling both circulation and revenues and moving its facilities to Cincinnati's tallest building, Carew Tower. It was purchased by Detroit-based Hour Media in 2017. It is a member of the City and Regional Magazine Association (CRMA).

Notable people 

 Kathy Y. Wilson

References

External links
 Official website

1967 establishments in Ohio
Lifestyle magazines published in the United States
Local interest magazines published in the United States
Monthly magazines published in the United States
Magazines established in 1967
Magazines published in Cincinnati